Đạ Tẻh is a township and capital of Đạ Tẻh District, Lâm Đồng Province, Vietnam.

References

Populated places in Lâm Đồng province
District capitals in Vietnam
Communes of Lâm Đồng province
Townships in Vietnam